Van Wijngen International is a European logistic company based in the Netherlands, in the middle of the Benelux transportation roads between the two main ports; Antwerp and Rotterdam. The company owns around 110 trucks and provides services such as distributing goods with their own trucks and third party suppliers. They have two locations; one in Breda, Netherlands and one in Valenciennes, France. Van Wijngen currently employs about 130 people.

History
Van Wijngen was established as a small company owned by Martien van Wijngen since 1985. Back then, Van Wijngen transported fresh fruits and vegetables from the farmers in Spain, the Netherlands and France. There was a high demand of fruits and vegetables to be delivered on time so that the farmers would get the highest market price. 
As time went by, the transportation of (common) products had become the focus of the company.

Location
The head office of Van Wijngen International is located on the industrial terrain in Hazeldonk, Breda. They have another office with French employees based in Valenciennes, France. All the neighboring countries have a population of more than 60 million people. Van Wijngen saw this opportunity to step into the market of distributing common products.

Bankruptcy in 2010
Due to the recession in 2008, many transportation companies had suffered severe consequences of the economic crisis. Van Wijngen was one of them. They had to cut down on their staff and the number of trucks they owned. However, by 2013, things have picked up for the company.

References

External links

Logistics companies of the Netherlands
Dutch companies established in 1985
Transport companies established in 1985